Antonio Pedro Tabet (Rio de Janeiro, June 26, 1974) is an advertising, scriptwriter and Brazilian comedian.
Tabet is one of the creators of the channel Porta dos Fundos. 
He was vice president of communication at Clube de Regatas do Flamengo between 2015 and 2017. Currently, he is among the stars of Borges Importadora.

References

1974 births
Federal University of Rio de Janeiro alumni
Brazilian screenwriters
Male actors from Rio de Janeiro (city)
Brazilian male comedians
Living people